Ipsden Heath is a 32-acre (13-hectare) woodland in the English county of Oxfordshire, within the Chiltern Area of Outstanding Natural Beauty.

References

Forests and woodlands of Oxfordshire
Chiltern Hills